Rómulo Filipe Cunha da Silva (born 13 July 1976), known simply as Rómulo, is a Portuguese former footballer who played as a left back.

Club career
Rómulo was born in Gondomar, Porto District. He spent his entire professional career with local Gondomar S.C. as captain, making his first-team debut at the age of 17 and helping the club promote from the regional leagues to the second division, where he played for five consecutive seasons (2004–09).

In the 2008–09 campaign, the 32-year-old Rómulo still appeared in 19 league games for Gondomar, but his team finished last – they would have faced relegation anyway due to corruption – and returned to the third tier. In the summer of 2010, he joined amateurs C.F. Oliveira do Douro also in northern Portugal.

References

External links

1976 births
Living people
People from Gondomar, Portugal
Portuguese footballers
Association football defenders
Liga Portugal 2 players
Segunda Divisão players
Gondomar S.C. players
Sportspeople from Porto District